Sirdalsvatnet is a lake in the municipalities of Sirdal and Flekkefjord in Agder county, Norway.

See also
List of lakes in Norway

References

Sirdal
Flekkefjord
Lakes of Agder